Hristo Petev (born 21 March 1983) is a Bulgarian footballer.

References

External links

Living people
1983 births
Bulgarian footballers
Association football midfielders
PFC Svetkavitsa players
First Professional Football League (Bulgaria) players

Association football defenders